Baadshah is a 1999 Indian Hindi-language action comedy film directed by Abbas–Mustan. The film stars Shah Rukh Khan and Twinkle Khanna in lead roles. It was released on 27 August 1999. Khan earned a Filmfare Award for Best Performance in a Comic Role nomination for his performance in the film. The film's core plot is loosely based on the 1995 American film Nick of Time

Plot 
Raj a.k.a. Baadshah is a young man living with his mother, who wishes to follow in his late father's footsteps (Ganapat) by working as a detective named Baadshah. He runs a detective agency out of a Mumbai office full of cheesy detective gadgetry. In his employ are his loyal and helpful friends, and his chief assistant Ramlal. Though Baadshah tries hard to pass his agency off as highly sophisticated and constantly busy, he actually receives little business and is desperate for a big break. Suraj Singh Thapar is a business tycoon whose bio-chemical plant is due to be shut down following a preventable industrial accident.

It will be shut down by the CM of Goa, Gayatri Bachchan. As a result, he resolves to have her killed. For the job, he has Rani, his young henchwoman, hire Shiva, Mumbai's notorious contract-killer. Meanwhile, a man by the name of K. Jhunjhunwala comes to Baadshah with a strange case. He claims he is dying of a brain tumor and wants to see his daughter married to the suitable bachelor accompanying him, Nitin before he dies. The young woman, Seema, refuses to marry Nitin, hence the need for Baadshah's help. Baadshah comes up with an elaborate plan for the job: he woos Seema with lies and has her fall in love with him, only to dump her later.

Nitin comforts her, and Baadshah collects his payment. However, his feelings for her prove to be genuine. Unbeknownst to Baadshah, Jhunjhunwala and Nitin are actually a father-son team wanted by the CBI. The marriage of Nitin to Seema, who is actually the sister of CBI Secret Agent Deepak Malhotra, is meant to stop an investigation into their bank fraud case. The plan fails when Agent Malhotra arrests the Jhunjhunwalas before the marriage can take place. It is revealed by the CBI that Shiva's attempt on Gayatri Bachchan's life failed as a result of his death in a car accident.

Fearing a second attempt, CBI headquarters tasks Agent Malhotra with providing further protection for the minister in Goa. Malhotra is assigned the codename "Baadshah" for the mission. Thapar becomes informed of this and speaks to Rani who plans with her boyfriend, Moti, to travel to the airport to eliminate Secret Agent "Baadshah" and have Moti assume his identity to gain access to Bachchan and carry out the assassination. At the same time, Baadshah the detective gets a job from Mahendra Seth. Manikchand and Saxena want to gain his diamonds and have kidnapped the businessman's child for ransom. Baadshah and his friend are given tickets to Goa, where the child is being held.

Both "Baadshahs" are scheduled for the same flight. Agent Malhotra arrives at the ticket counter and Rani identifies him as Baadshah. This information is passed onto Moti, who quietly kills Malhotra. Baadshah comes up to the ticket counter and is mistakenly given Agent 420's ticket. Baadshah also finds Malhotra's fallen computer disk. At this point, Baadshah has functionally switched places with the deceased agent. Moti arrives at the ticket counter announcing himself as Baadshah and is given the real Baadshah's ticket. During the flight, Rani realizes Moti killed the wrong man. Seema and her partner Tom Uncle are at the Goa airport expecting Agent Malhotra but see Baadshah instead.

Seema knows him as Raj and wonders what he is up to. Baadshah meets CBI Agent Adi Chopra and thinks he works for Mahendra Seth while Agent Chopra believes Baadshah is the secret CBI Agent. They leave the airport and go meet CBI Dr. Rusi Surti who gives Baadshah an assortment of top-secret gadgets and a James Bond-style car for assistance on his mission. They commend him about the way he solved the Jhunjhunwalas' case, which Baadshah is shocked to learn is regarding them being arrested for bank fraud. He realizes that Jhunjhunwala lied to him earlier and that he made a big mistake with Seema.

Back at the airport, Baadshah's friends are picked up by a driver posing for Mahendra Seth but he's employed by Manikchand and Saxena the kidnappers. Seema, who had been following Baadshah, arranges to meet with him. They meet and he apologizes to her about what happened before. They reconcile temporarily but Seema wants to know what happened to Agent Malhotra. Moti interrupts their conversation and Seema flees while Baadshah and Moti fight. Baadshah remembers that he previously saw Moti back at the Mumbai airport pushing a man in the wheelchair, who Moti admits he had killed.

Baadshah escapes and later receives a call from the kidnappers. He is told by the kidnappers to meet to exchange the diamonds for the child at Saint Paul school the next day. During the call, Baadshah notices in a reflection that Seema is secretly nearby. Seema searches Baadshah's hotel room and finds the computer disk and takes it, unaware that Baadshah is watching her. She checks the disk and finds out that Agent Malhotra and CBI highly suspect Thapar as the man behind the assassination attempt. Seema and Tom Uncle now suspect that Baadshah is a fraud who took her brother's place and is working with Thapar in his plan to kill Bachchan.

She heads to Thapar's club to meet Thapar, where Baadshah also shows up after following Seema. Thapar thinks Baadshah is the substitute that Rani arranged for, while Baadshah thinks Thapar is the Chief for Mahendra Seth. Baadshah tells Thapar that the work will be done the next day at Saint Paul school. Thapar thinks Baadshah is talking about the murder of Bachchan, who coincidentally has a program planned at Saint Paul school the next day as well.

The next day, Baadshah meets with the kidnappers to do the exchange. Finding the child and his friends, Baadshah saves them and captures the criminal duo. He sends Ramlal and the others to an address given by Thapar. Baadshah thinks his friends will meet Thapar to return the diamonds and the child while Thapar thinks they have kidnapped Bachchan and are bringing her to him. Baadshah drives the kidnappers towards town. Back at St. Paul's School, Seema tells security about the planned assassination.

Khanna, the corrupt chief security officer is informed and sends his men after Seema to kill her for knowing their secret. Baadshah spots her being chased while driving back and saves her. They both discuss everything they know and come to realize their misunderstandings. Rani and Moti secretly listen to and witness everything as well and they too understand the confusion. Seema and Baadshah find themselves in dire straits; Seema learns that Agent Malhotra, who she reveals was her brother, is dead; Baadshah's friends and the child are now in the custody of Thapar, who isn't who Baadshah thought he was.

Thapar meets with Baadshah's friends and the child and is confused. Rani shows up with Moti and explains all the misunderstanding. Thapar decides to use the situation to his advantage. He forces Baadshah to assassinate Bachchan himself or else Thapar will kill his friends and the child. The key players travel to the Holiday Inn, where Bachchan is to speak at 12:30 pm during a conference. The child is strapped to a bomb vest and held hostage in a van monitored by Moti and Baadshah's friends are held in a high-rise room monitored by Rani.

Baadshah makes multiple attempts to have his gun taken away by security to get out of having to shoot Bachchan, but he realizes that the entire on-site security force is in cahoots with Thapar, keeping tabs on Baadshah. At one point during a conference by Bachchan, Baadshah quietly meets Sheetal clad in a pink skirt suit,who is Bachchan's young Secretary, by dropping her document on the floor at gun point he informs her in a brusque manner about the plan to assassinate her Boss and the desperate situation that he is in, asking her to save the life of her boss.

After being told that the security team is corrupt and unable to convey the bad news personally to her boss the terrified Sheetal unaware to her that she is in peril decides to invite Baadshah up to meet the CM's husband, Tyagraj Bachchan whom she trusted the most, to tell him about the danger his wife is in. However the husband who is angry with Sheetal for knowing his evil plan immediately , kills the poor Sheetal in cold blood and it is revealed that he is behind the plan to kill his wife. After killing the late Sheetal Thapar and Khanna tell Baadshah that he has another chance to kill Bachchan during a speech scheduled at 2 pm.

Baadshah secretly writes a message in a note for Bachchan which Seema (under disguise as a hotel worker) places inside the CM's speech script folder while in her room. With Seema's assistance, Baadshah escapes the building via a washroom window to go rescue his friends and the child. He succeeds but Baadshah and his friends realize that they don't know how to defuse or remove the bomb strapped to the child, and so Baadshah must head back into the hotel. He returns to the washroom just before Khanna realizes he left.

It's 2:00 pm and they now head to the speech hall. Baadshah is confident that Bachchan will not come down after reading his message but is shocked to see Bachchan arrive at the hall and knows he must make a move as Thapar still has control of the detonator. Baadshah slowly approaches Bachchan as she arrives at the podium and discovers the note written to her. She reads it and learns of the assassination plan and that the mastermind behind it is her husband, who lied to her about the late Sheetal's disappearance by exposing the late Sheetal's death. She learns that Baadshah will have to shoot her if she comes down for her speech. Bachchan notices Baadshah coming towards the front and knows what he is being compelled to do.

In a climactic moment, Baadshah pulls out his gun and opens fire upon the security personnel, triggering a shootout. He manages to wipe them all out, including Khanna. Thapar realizes he has the chance to shoot Bachchan himself and fires at her. Her personal bodyguard tries to cover her and they both fall to the ground. She survives, much to the shock of her husband who tries to flee but is stopped by CBI officers. Thapar is also shocked when she sees Bachchan stand up and he tries to shoot her once again but Baadshah interferes and disarms him.

Thapar then pulls out his bomb remote and intends on detonating it because Baadshah has ruined his plan. Just then, Thapar's van enters the room and he is shocked to see Baadshah's friends and CBI agents appear from it, along with the child and the bomb. They all dare Thapar to detonate the bomb now. Thapar flees and is pursued by Baadshah while Dr. Surti works on the bomb. He manages to remove it and they throw it out of the building. Thapar escapes and finds Rani and Moti outside and tells them to detonate the bomb once he is inside his car.

However, Thapar is killed when the bomb detonates under his car. In the end, Baadshah is seen to have a booming business back at his detective agency. Ram Lal receives a call from President Bill Clinton, offering $1,000,000 for assistance with the "Monica Case". Baadshah announces his prioritization of "wife duty", refusing the case and travelling with Seema.

Cast

Soundtrack 

The soundtrack has 6 songs composed by Anu Malik. Most of the songs are sung by Abhijeet. The artists are Alka Yagnik & Anu Malik. The soundtrack was well received.

Reception 
Writing for Rediff.com, Syed Firdaus Ashraf mentioned that Khan had "performed well, so have Twinkle and her navel, which was in full view right through the film".

Box office 
It is the 8th-highest-grossing film of 1999 worldwide.

India 
It opened on Friday, 27 August 1999, across 280 screens, and earned  nett on its opening day. It grossed  nett in its opening weekend, and had a first week of  nett. The film earned a total of  nett, and was declared "Average" by Box Office India. It is the 10th-highest-grossing film of 1999 in India.

Overseas 
It had an opening weekend of $550,000 (2.39 crore) and went on to gross $780,000 (3.39 crore) in its first week. The film earned a total of $1.5 million (6.52 crore) at the end of its theatrical run. Overseas, It is the 6th-highest-grossing film of 1999.

Awards

References

External links 
 

1999 films
1999 action comedy films
1990s spy thriller films
1990s comedy thriller films
1990s Hindi-language films
Films directed by Abbas–Mustan
Films set in Mumbai
Indian action comedy films
Indian detective films
Indian spy thriller films
Films scored by Anu Malik
Films scored by Surinder Sodhi
Indian comedy thriller films
1999 comedy films